La Mosquitia is the easternmost part of Honduras along the Mosquito Coast, which extends into northeastern Nicaragua. It is a region of tropical rainforest, pine savannah, and marsh that is accessible primarily by water and air. Its population includes indigenous and ethnic groups such as the Miskito, Pech, Rama, Sumo, Garífuna, Ladino, and Creole peoples. La Mosquitia has the largest wilderness area in Central America, consisting of mangrove swamps, lagoons, rivers, savannas, and tropical rain forests. The Río Plátano Biosphere Reserve, a World Heritage site, is a part of La Mosquitia.

The Mosquitia region is part of the Gracias a Dios Department of northeastern Honduras, the second largest department of the country after Olancho, with 16,630 km2. Most of the territory is a very hot and humid plain, crossed by numerous streams and rivers, including the Plátano, Patuca, Waruna, and Coco rivers. The largest coastal lagoon in Honduras, Caratasca Lagoon, is in the region. It is shallow, with saline water, and is separated from the sea by a thin stretch of sand.

The climate of La Mosquitia promotes the growth of a dense tropical forest, which is now set aside for preservation. The Río Plátano Biosphere Reserve, part of the so-called "great lungs" of Central America, covers nearly 7% of Honduran territory. It is home to a great diversity of flora and fauna. Among its many species are the jaguar, tapir, peccary, crocodile, manatee, garza (heron), and White-headed capuchin (monkey).

The population in 2008 exceeded 80,000 inhabitants, representing a population density of 4.8 inhabitants/km2, the lowest in the country. The primary income of the population is derived from lobster diving. As of 1997, there was no tourism activity in the area.

La Mosquitia is used as a route for illegal drug smuggling.

While the lush jungle rainforest is attractive for tourism, limited facilities and connecting transportation make it a challenge. The community-based-tourism project La Ruta Moskitia Ecotourism Alliance is trying to change that.

On March 2, 2015, it was announced by National Geographic that an expedition into the region discovered a previously unknown ruined city. The expedition was seeking the site of the legendary "White City" (La Ciudad Blanca), also known as the "City of the Monkey God", a goal for Western explorers since the days of the Spanish conquistadors in the sixteenth century. The team mapped plazas, earthworks, mounds, and an earthen pyramid belonging to an unknown culture. The team also discovered a cache of stone sculptures at the base of the pyramid structure.

A paper published in 1999 located and mapped the site using Synthetic-aperture radar based on information obtained from local inhabitants during an expedition to the area in 1993.

The ruins were again identified in May 2012 with the use of LIDAR and subsequently explored in secret with the assistance of the Honduran military. The team documented the site, but left it unexcavated. To protect the site its location is not being revealed.
Regions of Central America

See also
Cape Camarón
 
Juan Pablo Suazo Euceda, author of two novels set in La Mosquitia
Miskito
Mosquito Coast
Mosquito County
The Mosquito Coast (1986 film)

References

Geography of Honduras
Gracias a Dios Department
Miskito